Murmuri Rural District is a rural district (dehestan) in Kalat District, Abdanan County, Ilam Province, Iran. At the 2006 census, its population was 1,172 in 221 families.  The rural district has 15 villages.

References 

Rural Districts of Ilam Province
Abdanan County